The 1985 Vuelta a España was the 40th edition of the Vuelta a España, one of cycling's Grand Tours. The Vuelta began in Valladolid, with a prologue individual time trial on 23 April, and Stage 9 occurred on 2 May with a stage to Balneario de Panticosa. The race finished in Salamanca on 12 May.

Prologue
23 April 1985 — Valladolid to Valladolid,  (ITT)

Stage 1
24 April 1985 — Valladolid to Zamora,

Stage 2
25 April 1985 — Zamora to Orense,

Stage 3
26 April 1985 — Ourense to Santiago de Compostela,

Stage 4
27 April 1985 — Santiago de Compostela to Lugo,

Stage 5
28 April 1985 — Lugo to Oviedo,

Stage 6
29 April 1985 — Oviedo to Lakes of Covadonga,

Stage 7
30 April 1985 — Cangas de Onís to Alto Campoo,

Stage 8
1 May 1985 — Aguilar de Campoo to Logroño,

Stage 9
2 May 1985 — Logroño to Balneario de Panticosa,

References

1985 Vuelta a España
Vuelta a España stages